Irving Burton "Stubby" Ray  (1864–1948) was an American professional baseball shortstop. He played  with the Boston Beaneaters of the National League from 1888 to 1889  and the  Baltimore Orioles  of the American Association from 1889 to 1891. He played college baseball at Maine before beginning his professional career.

References

External links
Baseball-Reference page

1864 births
1948 deaths
Baseball players from Maine
People from Washington County, Maine
19th-century baseball players
Major League Baseball shortstops
Boston Beaneaters players
Baltimore Orioles (AA) players
Salem Witches players
Baltimore Orioles (IL) players
Maine Black Bears baseball players
Baltimore Orioles (Atlantic Association) players